Massimo Ganci (born 17 November 1981) is an Italian footballer who currently plays for Unipomezia Virtus as a forward.

He played 10 games in the Serie A in the 2004–05 season for Reggina Calcio.

Career
Ganci started his professional career at Monza. In June 2001, along with Diego Daldosso, Daniele Degano and Cristian Maggioni, they were signed by Parma in co-ownership deal for 1 billion each (€516,457). In June 2002 Daldosso and Ganci was bought back by Monza while Degano and Maggioni joined Parma outright. Ganci also immediately left for Treviso in temporary deal in summer 2002.

Ganci was signed outright by Treviso in January 2004, after a -season loan from Monza. In summer 2004 he left for Reggina Calcio, where he made his Serie A debut. As he made his Serie A debut, FIGC accepted the claim from his youth club Corsico against Reggina for training compensation of €103,000 an incentive scheme set-up by FIGC. In January 2005 he was signed by Piacenza in new co-ownership deal, re-joining Degano. In January 2006 Ganci left for Bari in temporary deal.

Bari acquired Piacenza's half registration rights on Ganci in summer 2006 via Treviso, which Bari paid Treviso €250,000; In June 2007 Bari acquired Ganci outright from Treviso. Ganci was included in Bari's 2008 pre-season camp on 14 July despite he would join the team on 16 July. On 1 September 2008 Ganci joined Cittadella. In January 2009 he was signed by Salernitana.

In July 2009 he left for Pescara. In 2011–12 Serie B season, he was awarded no.99 shirt of the team,

Ganci was released by Pescara along with Samuele Olivi on 29 August; on the same day he was signed by Frosinone in 2-year contract.

Italian football scandal
On 16 July 2013 Ganci was suspended from football for 4 years due to involvement in 2011 Italian football scandal. His appeal was rejected on 27 July. On 27 April 2014 his final appeal was accepted, which the ban was reduced to 22 months.

Maceratese
On 21 July 2015 Ganci was signed by Maceratese.

Unipomezia Virtus
In December 2019, Ganci joined Unipomezia Virtus.

References

External links
 
 

1981 births
Living people
Italian footballers
Italian expatriate footballers
Serie A players
Serie B players
Serie C players
Serie D players
Maltese Premier League players
A.C. Monza players
Treviso F.B.C. 1993 players
Reggina 1914 players
Piacenza Calcio 1919 players
S.S.C. Bari players
A.S. Cittadella players
U.S. Salernitana 1919 players
Delfino Pescara 1936 players
Frosinone Calcio players
L'Aquila Calcio 1927 players
F.C. Pavia players
Ħamrun Spartans F.C. players
A.S.D. Barletta 1922 players
Italy youth international footballers
Association football forwards
S.S. Maceratese 1922 players
Italian expatriate sportspeople in Malta
Expatriate footballers in Malta